Manoel Afonso Júnior (born November 14, 1991) is a Brazilian football player who plays for Murici.

Career
Afonso has played professionally in Japan with Gamba Osaka and in Portugal with Académica de Coimbra.

Club statistics

References

External links

1991 births
Living people
Brazilian footballers
Brazilian expatriate footballers
Botafogo Futebol Clube (SP) players
Clube de Regatas Brasil players
Associação Académica de Coimbra – O.A.F. players
Gamba Osaka players
Primeira Liga players
J1 League players
Expatriate footballers in Portugal
Expatriate footballers in Japan
Association football forwards